is the first album by Japanese idol girl group Hiragana Keyakizaka46. It was released on 20 June 2018. The album reached the top position on the weekly Oricon Albums Chart. It also reached number one on the Billboard Japan Hot Albums Chart.

Track listing
All lyrics written by Yasushi Akimoto.

DISC 1 (Type-A)

DISC 2 (Type-A)

DISC 1 (Type-B)

DISC 2 (Type-B)

Regular edition

Charts

References

Hinatazaka46 albums
Japanese-language albums
2018 debut albums